Luttra is a locality situated in Falköping Municipality, Västra Götaland County, Sweden.

Populated places in Västra Götaland County
Populated places in Falköping Municipality